Thun Palace is a palace in Malá Strana, Prague, that houses the Chamber of Deputies of the Czech Republic. It has been listed as a National Cultural Monument of the Czech Republic since 1992.

History 
Thun Palace has been listed as a Cultural Monument of the Czech Republic since May 3, 1958, and a National Cultural Monument of the Czech Republic since October 15, 1992.

See also 

 Wallenstein Palace
 Thun und Hohenstein

References 

Palaces in Prague
Neoclassical palaces
Government buildings completed in 1726
Houses completed in 1726
National Cultural Monuments of the Czech Republic
Thun und Hohenstein